Grevenberg is a hamlet in the Netherlands and is part of the Coevorden municipality in Drenthe. North of Grevenberg lies Oosterhesselen and south lies Wachtum.

Grevenberg is not a statistical entity, and the postal authorities have placed it under Wachtum. It was first mentioned in 1843, and means grave hill which is a references to a pre-historic burial mount known as Hunenkerkhof. The hamlet consist of about 25 houses.

References 

Coevorden
Populated places in Drenthe